Gilles is a Canadian short drama film, directed by Constant Mentzas and released in 2008. The film stars Hélène Loiselle as an elderly woman who has spent her life caring for her developmentally disabled son Gilles (Réjean Lefrançois), but who is now terminally ill and struggling to prepare him for the day he will have to move into assisted living.

The film was the last significant acting role for Loiselle, one of Quebec's major actresses of the 20th century, before her own death in 2013.

The film was a Genie Award nominee for Best Live Action Short Drama at the 30th Genie Awards in 2010.

References

External links

2008 films
2008 short films
Canadian drama short films
Films shot in Quebec
Quebec films
French-language Canadian films
2000s Canadian films